The Jurca MJ-6 Crivats (from Crivăț a wind in Romania) is a plans built homebuilt, twin engine design from Romanian-born Marcel Jurca.

Design
The MJ-6 was designed to be a retractable tricycle geared, low-wing, all-wood construction, twin engine homebuilt. The wooden structure is covered with 1/8" plywood panels. The engine gauges are mounted externally on the engine nacelles facing the pilot. The cowlings and canopy were to be sourced from Falconar Avia. 

Construction was started in 1964, but it was never completed. It was a two-seat tandem design - a side-by-side version, the MJ-66 was also planned but never built.

Specifications (MJ-6)

See also

References

Homebuilt aircraft